Taman Jurong is a residential precinct in Jurong West, Singapore. It is one of the oldest residential precincts in Singapore and a division of Jurong GRC, with the area's HDB flats under the management of Jurong-Clementi Town Council and Tharman Shanmugaratnam as the area's MP.

Taman means garden or park in Malay. Hence, the area translates to “Jurong Garden/Park”.

Residential areas
The precinct has a good mixture of private and public residential areas.

Public residential areas

Private residential areas
Non-Landed Housing:
The Lakefront Residences
Caspian
Lake Life
LakeHolmz
Lakepoint Condominium
Lakeside Apartments
Lakeside Towers
Yuan Ching Road Apartments (Parkview Mansions)
Kang Ching Road Apartments
Landed Housing:
Lakeside Grove

Transportation

Roads
The main roads in the precinct are Corporation Road, Corporation Drive, Yung Ho Road, and Yuan Ching Road, which connects the precinct to the rest of the island through the AYE(exits 15A and 15B), with minor roads (Yung Loh/Ping/An/Kuang/Sheng Roads, Hu/Tao/Ho/Tah/Kang Ching Roads, Corporation Rise/Walk Roads and Japanese/Chinese Garden Roads) winding through the various places in the precinct.

Initially, when first built, all the road names in Taman Jurong were numbered in Malay, from "Taman Jurong 1" to "Taman Jurong 12" (skipping 11). Corporation Road used to go by the name of "Jalan Peng Kang". JTC Corporation renamed these roads to their current names in 1970.

Public transport

Feeder bus services
The precinct is linked to Lakeside MRT station through feeder service 240 which zips through the town via Corporation Drive and loops at Yung Ho Road, Corporation Road, Jalan Ahmad Ibrahim and Yuan Ching Road, providing connection to the MRT System for residents staying in the precinct.

Trunk bus Services
The trunk services in Taman Jurong connects residents staying in the precinct to the other precincts in Singapore. There are 6 trunk services that plies through Taman Jurong via the different roads.Yuan Ching Road:
154 connects residents to Teban Gardens, Pandan Gardens, Clementi, Bukit Timah, Toa Payoh, Potong Pasir, MacPherson, Geylang and Eunos. It also provides direct connection to Jurong Point Shopping Centre.
Corporation Drive:
98 connects residents to Jurong Port, Jurong West, Yuhua and Jurong East. It also provides connection to Lakeside MRT station.
30 connects residents to Teban Gardens, Pandan Gardens, West Coast, Pasir Panjang, Buona Vista, Telok Blangah, Harbourfront, Tanjong Pagar, Marina Bay, East Coast, Kallang, Geylang, Eunos and Bedok.
246 connects residents to Pioneer Sector and Boon Lay. It also provides connection to Lakeside MRT station.
49 connects residents to Jurong West Street 51/42/41. It also provides connection to Lakeside MRT station.
Corporation Road:
178 connects residents to Teban Gardens, Yuhua, Bukit Batok, Bukit Panjang, Kranji and Woodlands.
79 connects residents to the Pioneer Sector, Jurong Port, Teban Gardens and Jurong East.

Schools
There is 1 primary school (Lakeside) and 2 secondary schools (Yuan Ching and Jurong) of which it is notable.

Recreational
There are 5 parks in Taman Jurong, namely Jurong Lake Gardens along Yuan Ching Road, Taman Jurong Park at Yung Loh Road, Taman Jurong Greens at Yung An Road, Lakeside Ground Playground at Corporation Walk and a neighbourhood park at Yung Ho Road. Track and Field activities can be carried out at the Jurong Stadium, Futsal at Jurong Futsal Outdoor Centre, Bowling at  Jurong, Fishing at Lakeside Fishing Centre and Country Club activities at the Fairway Club of Palm Resort, which are located along Corporation Road and Yuan Ching Road respectively. 

Places of Interest:  

(Last updated Mar 2014)   Our Museum @ Taman Jurong located next to Taman Jurong Community Club. This is a project by the National Heritage Board (NHB) in partnership with Taman Jurong CCC, Taman Jurong Community A&C Club, People's Association (PA). Since its opening on 12 Jan 2013, Our Museum has received generous municipal as well as public support for its effort to engage the local community in appreciating & take ownership of the neighbourhood's distinct heritage.  Our Museum aim to offer quarterly updates by collaborating with residents and local artists to co-create artworks for the museum.

Town centre
The town centre is located along Yung Sheng Road, consisting of Taman Jurong Community Centre, Taman Jurong Food and Market Centre and Taman Jurong Shopping Centre. It is accessible through all the bus services except 154 and 49.

Places of worship
There are 1 Chinese temple (Bo Tien Temple), 1 mosque (Masjid Assyakirin) and 3 churches (Jurong Christian Church, Calvary Bible-Presbyterian Church and Agape Methodist Church) in this precinct.

Healthcare
Jurong West's only hospital is in this precinct. Known as the West Point Hospital, it is a 24-Hour A&E and Walk-in Clinic that is located along Corporation Drive.

As of 2023, The Building On Corporation Drive remains abandoned, while the Clinic has moved onto Jurong West St 81.

It is accessible through all the bus services in this precinct except 154 and 178. There are also many clinics where GP (General practitioner) are available.

Industrial areas
At the southern tip of Taman Jurong, there are 2 industrial developments, The Agape at the junction of Yuan Ching Road and Yung Ho Road and Corporation Place at the junction of Corporation Road and Jalan Ahmad Ibrahim.

References

External links
Taman Jurong Community Website
Jurong-Clementi Town Council

Places in Singapore
Jurong West